Giuseppe Cipriani (1900-1980) was the founder of Harry's Bar in Venice, Italy, opening the establishment in 1931. He is the inventor of both the bellini cocktail and the raw beef dish carpaccio.

References

Italian chefs
1900 births
1980 deaths